Haguenau (Alsatian:   or ;  and historically in English: Hagenaw) is a commune in the Bas-Rhin department of France, of which it is a sub-prefecture.

To the north of the town, the Forest of Haguenau is the largest undivided forest in France.

Haguenau was founded by German dukes and has swapped back and forth several times between Germany and France over the centuries, with its spelling altering between "Hagenau" and "Haguenau" by the turn. After the French defeat in the Franco-Prussian War, Haguenau was ceded to the new German Empire. It was part of the German Empire for 48 years from 1871 to 1918, when at the end of World War I it was returned to France. This transfer was officially ratified in 1919 with the Treaty of Versailles.

Haguenau is a rapidly growing town, its population having increased from 22,944 inhabitants in 1968 to 34,504 inhabitants in 2017. Haguenau's functional urban area has grown from 54,415 inhabitants in 1968 to 75,933 inhabitants in 2017.

History

Haguenau dates from the beginning of the 12th century, when Duke Frederick II the One-Eyed (1090 – 6 April 1147) of Swabia erected a hunting lodge on an island in the river Moder. The medieval King and Holy Roman Emperor Frederick I Barbarossa fortified the settlement and gave it town rights, important for further development, in 1154. On the site of the hunting lodge he founded an imperial palace he regarded as his favourite residence. In this palace were preserved the "Crown Jewels of the Holy Roman Empire", i.e. the jewelled imperial crown, sceptre, imperial orb, and sword of Charlemagne.

Richard of Cornwall, King of the Romans, made it an imperial city in 1257. In the 14th century, it housed the executive council of the Decapole, a defensive and offensive association of ten Alsatian towns against external aggression, economic expansion and related political instability. In the Peace of Westphalia in 1648, Alsace was ceded to France, which had repeatedly invaded and looted the region in the past. In 1673 King Louis XIV had the fortifications as well as the remains of the king's palace razed in order to extinguish German traditions. Haguenau was recaptured by German troops in 1675, but was taken again by the French two years later, when it was nearly destroyed by fire set by looting French troops.

In 1793 Prussians and Austrians had occupied Lower Alsace from the Lauter to Moder to support the Royalists and before the year's end were driven back over the border by the French Revolutionary Army, causing the “great flight”.

In 1871, Haguenau was ceded to the German Empire upon its victory in the Franco-Prussian War; the community was made part of Alsace-Lorraine, with its Germanic spelling–Hagenau–restored.

The Haguenau Airport was built in 1916 by the German military to train fighter and bomber pilots to fight in the First World War.

Hagenau was part of the briefly independent Republic of Alsace-Lorraine after World War I, before being returned to France in 1919.

Second World War
In the Second World War, Germany retook the town in 1940. In November 1944 the area surrounding Haguenau was under the control of the 256th Volksgrenadier Division under the command of General Gerhard Franz.

On 1 December 1944, the 314th Infantry Regiment of the 79th Division, XV Corps, 7th U.S. Army, moved into the area near Haguenau, and on 7 December the regiment was given the assignment to take it and the town forest just north that included German ammunition dumps. The attack began at 0645, 9 December, and sometime during the night of 10 December and the early morning of 11 December the Germans withdrew under the cover of darkness, leaving the town proper largely under American control.

Before they withdrew, the Germans demolished bridges, useful buildings, and even the town park. However, as experienced by Haguenau throughout its history, the Germans came back and retook the town in late January. Most of the inhabitants fled with the assistance of the U.S. Army. The Americans launched an immediate counterattack to retake the town. The 313th Infantry Regiment of the 79th Division was relieved by the 101st Airborne Division on 5 February 1945. The 36th Infantry Division would relieve the 101st on 23 February 1945. On March 15 the Allied Operation Undertone, a combined effort of the U.S. Seventh and French 1st Armies of the U.S. Sixth Army Group was launched to drive the Germans back along a 75 km line from Saarbrücken to Haguenau. The last German soldier was not cleared out of the town until 19 March 1945, after house-to-house fighting.

Much of the town had been destroyed despite the Allied reluctance to use artillery to clear out the Germans. Technical Sergeant Morris E. Crain, Company E, 141st Infantry Regiment, 36th Infantry Division was posthumously awarded the Medal of Honor for providing covering fire for his men on 13 March 1945.

Population

Economy
The town has a well balanced economy. Centuries of troubled history in the buffer lands between France and Germany have given Haguenau a rich historical and cultural heritage which supports a lively tourist trade. There is also a thriving light manufacturing sector centred on the industrial zone to the west of the town. Here the presence nearby of significant retail developments testifies to Haguenau's importance as a regional commercial centre. The recent extension of the ring road has improved access to the commercial and industrial zones and reduced the traffic congestion which used to be a frequent challenge for vehicle drivers using the road which follows the line of the old town walls on the western side of town.

Sights

Architecture
In spite of the extensive destruction Haguenau suffered during the many wars experienced by Alsace, especially the Thirty Years War, the French conquest in 1677 and the Second World War, it still possesses monuments from nine centuries, even if nothing is left of arguably the most prestigious of them, Frederick I Barbarossa's imperial palace (Kaiserpfalz).

Medieval Haguenau retains three gates from its former fortification, the Tour des Chevaliers (Tower of the knights), the Tour des Pêcheurs (Tower of the fishermen) and the Porte de Wissembourg (Wissembourg gate), two fairly large Gothic churches, Saint-Georges and Saint-Nicolas, an ancient water-mill and the old custom-house (Ancienne Douane). Both Saint-Georges and Saint-Nicolas Church have lost many of their artistic treasures over the centuries, especially their medieval stained glass windows and outside sculptures. Still, both display to this day some fine liturgical furniture (altars, choir stalls, organ cases, church tabernacles, calvaries...). Saint-Nicolas has become the receptacle for the baroque wooden decoration of the church of the destroyed Neubourg Abbey nearby.

French Baroque and classicism has bequeathed the town several buildings, among which the former hospital and the current town hall. The Synagogue (1820) is a fine example of French Neo-classicism, as is the theatre (Théâtre municipal) (1846). The large Hop hall (Halle au houblon) is a good example of historicism in architecture. It was built by the French in 1867 and extended twice by the Germans, in 1881 and 1908.

The Basilica of Our Lady in the locality of Marienthal is a vast Gothic Revival sanctuary (1863–1866). It keeps two early 15th-century statues, and a host of sculptures from around 1519.

Haguenau's streets are adorned by attractive fountains, the medieval Saint-Georges fountain, the 18th-century Bee fountain (Fontaine aux abeilles) and the 1825 Dolphin fountain (Fontaine aux dauphins).

Museums
 Musée historique de Haguenau (Historical Museum). The largest museum in Bas-Rhin outside of Strasbourg, it is located in a grand neo-medieval building (1905).
 Musée alsacien (Haguenau) (Alsatian Museum). Located in the former palace of the chancellor (Chancellerie), Haguenau's main Renaissance building.
 Musée du bagage (Baggage museum). Located in a former 1840s villa that subsequently served as a bank. The museum opened in April 2016.

Higher education
The Institut universitaire de technologie de Haguenau (IUT) was founded in 2006. It is a branch of the University of Strasbourg.

Notable people

 Thomas Anshelm (de)
 Werner Barkholt (1902–1942), a Catholic spiritualist
 Alfred von Beckerath (de)
 Charles Berdellé (fr)
 Stéphane Besle
 Philipp Biedert (de)
 Philipp Friedrich Böddecker (1607–1683), a Composer and organist
 David Léon Cahun (1841–1900), a Jewish French traveler, orientalist and writer
 Wolfgang Fabricius Capito(n) (Köpfel) (1478–1541), a Christian theologian and reformer
 Roger Corbeau (fr)
 Morris E. Crain (1924 – 13 March 1945), a United States Army soldier
 Louis Eisenmann (de)
 Frederick I
 Albert Gemmrich
 Karl Gengler (1886–1974), a politician
 Gustave Glotz
 Heinrich Gran (active from 1489 until 1527), a printer of incunabula
 Heinrich von Isny (de)
 Josel of Rosheim (1476–1554), a Jewish shtadlan, born here
 Cédric Klein (fr)
 Diebold Lauber (de)
 Borach Levi, later Joseph Jean François Elie (1721–?), a Jewish convert to Christianity
 Eliezer Liebermann (half of the 19th-century), an Austrian Jewish Talmudist son of the rabbi Zeeb-Wolf of this town
 Sébastien Loeb (born 1974), 9-time World Rally Championship-winning driver
 Marcel Loeffler (fr)
 Adam Friedrich Löwenfinck (de)
 Niklaus von Hagenau
 Jean-Georges Paulus
 Reinmar of Hagenau, 12th-century minnesinger
 Marie-Louise Roth (born 1926), a literary scientist (de)
 Elie Scheid (1841–1922), a Jewish French communal worker and writer
 Diebold Schilling the Younger (before 1460, Haguenau (?)–1515 (?)), an Alsatian-Swiss chronicler
 Marius Schneider (fr)
 Elek Schwartz
 Theobald Schwarz (de)
 Pierre Seel (1923–2005), an activist
 Eduard Stadtler
 Johannes Stroux
 Peter Stühlen (de)
 Joseph Thierry
 Michel Walter (fr)
 Mathieu Weill (1851–1939), a Jewish French mathematician

Twin towns
Haguenau is twinned with Landau (Germany).

Media
Episode eight of the Second World War miniseries Band of Brothers is set in Haguenau.

In the 1968 film Girl on a motorcycle, Marianne Faithfull's character sets out from Haguenau on her fateful journey.

See also
 Communes of the Bas-Rhin department
 Haguenau Airport

References
Notes

Bibliography

External links

 

 
Communes of Bas-Rhin
Subprefectures in France
Free imperial cities
Historic Jewish communities in Europe
Décapole
Populated places established in the 12th century